The R688 road is a regional road in County Tipperary, Ireland. The route runs from Cashel to Clonmel via Rosegreen, passing over junction 8 of the M8 motorway.

See also
Roads in Ireland
Motorways in Ireland
National primary road

References
Roads Act 1993 (Classification of Regional Roads) Order 2006 – Department of Transport

Regional roads in the Republic of Ireland
Roads in County Tipperary